State Line is an unincorporated community in Lafayette County, Arkansas, United States.

References

Unincorporated communities in Lafayette County, Arkansas
Unincorporated communities in Arkansas